'Iran Awakening: A Memoir of Revolution and Hope' is a memoir written by Nobel laureate Shirin Ebadi.

In her book, Ebadi recounts her public career and reveals her private self: her faith, her experiences, and her desire to lead a traditional life, even while serving as a rebellious voice in a land where such voices are muted and even silenced by brute force. Ebadi describes her girlhood in a modest Tehran household, her education, and her early professional success as Iran's most accomplished female jurist in the mid-1970s. She speaks eloquently about the ideals of the 1979 Iranian Revolution, and of her deep disillusionment with the direction Iran has taken since.

References

2006 non-fiction books
Political autobiographies
Books about politics of Iran
History books about Iran